A liquid biopsy, also known as fluid biopsy or fluid phase biopsy, is the sampling and analysis of non-solid biological tissue, primarily blood. Like traditional biopsy, this type of technique is mainly used as a diagnostic and monitoring tool for diseases such as cancer, with the added benefit of being largely non-invasive. Liquid biopsies may also be used to validate the efficiency of a cancer treatment drug by taking multiple samples in the span of a few weeks. The technology may also prove beneficial for patients after treatment to monitor relapse.

The clinical implementation of liquid biopsies is not yet widespread but is becoming standard of care in some areas.

Types 
There are several types of liquid biopsy methods; method selection depends on the condition that is being studied.

A wide variety of biomarkers may be studied to detect or monitor other diseases. For example, isolation of protoporphyrin IX from blood samples can be used as a diagnostic tool for atherosclerosis. Cancer biomarkers in the blood include PSA (prostate cancer), CA19-9 (pancreatic cancer) and CA-125 (ovarian cancer).

Mechanism 

Circulating tumor DNA (ctDNA) refers to DNA released by cancerous cells into the blood stream. Cancer mutations in ctDNA mirror those found in traditional tumor biopsies, which allows them to be used as molecular biomarkers to track the disease.
Scientists can purify and then analyze ctDNA using next-generation sequencing (NGS) or PCR-based methods such as digital PCR. NGS-based methods provide a comprehensive view of a cancer’s genetic makeup and is especially useful in diagnosis while digital PCR offers a more targeted approach especially well-suited for detecting minimal residual disease and for monitoring treatment response and disease progression. Recent progress in epigenetics has expanded the use of liquid biopsy for the detection of early-stage cancers, including by approaches such as Cancer Likelihood in Plasma (CLiP) .

Liquid biopsies can detect changes in tumor burden months or years before conventional imaging tests can, making them suitable for early tumor detection, monitoring, and detection of resistance mutations.  The increase in the adoption of NGS in various research fields, advancement in NGS, and increase in the adoption of personalized medicine are expected to drive growth in the global liquid biopsy market.

Clinical application 
The CellSearch method for enumeration of circulating tumor cells in metastatic breast, metastatic colon, and metastatic prostate cancer has been validated and approved by the FDA as a useful prognostic method.

Liquid biopsy for analysis of ctDNA for EGFR-mutated lung cancer is approved by the FDA.

See also 
 Radiographic imaging

References 

Biopsy
Medical procedures
Cancer screening